is a Japanese actress and gravure idol best known for her role as Kaoru Mitsuki in the Garo series. She is also known in the western world for her role as Namiko Takeda in the 2009 martial arts film Ninja and its 2013 sequel Ninja: Shadow of a Tear. Mika Hijii is affiliated with Stardust Promotion. She holds a bachelor's degree in business administration from Hosei University.

Hijii is an avid practitioner of Kung fu. In 2011, she participated in the team division of the 28th All Japan Wushu Tai Chi Championship. She and Yayoi Kumada, a stunt actress whose work includes Garo, placed fourth.

Hijii speaks fluent English. She studied abroad in New York City from July 2013 to January 2014 and has appeared in English-language education programs on NHK. She has also worked as a reporter for English-language outlets.

In 2019, she married a man who is not in the entertainment industry. The marriage was timed to coincide with the start of Japan's Reiwa era. She wrote on social media that she and her husband wanted to “cherish the joy of being able to build a relationship in a new way in the beginning of the new generation.”

In June 2020, she changed her stage name, spelling her given name in phonetic katakana rather than kanji.

Filmography

TV Drama
Doll House (2004)
Kamen Rider Blade (2004) as Miyuki Yoshinaga/Orchid Undead (eps. 20–25)
Soleá of Love as Tomoko Tadokoro (2004)
Garo (2005) as Kaoru Mitsuki
Fukuoka Ren'ai wa Kusho (2006)
Garo Special: Byakuya no Maju (2006) as Kaoru Mitsuki
Kin'iru no Tsubasa (2007)
Aibō (2010) as Natsuki Nanjo (season 8 ep. 11)
Arienai! (2010) as Saya (ep. 10)
Tokyo Little Love (2010) as Misaki Nakajima
Kudo Shinichi he no Chosenjo (2011) as Kaori Kisaragi (ep. 5)
Garo: Makai Senki (2011) as Kaoru Mitsuki
Taburakashi -Daigō Joyū-gyō Maki- (2012) as Saori (ep. 2)
Mikeneko Hōmuzu no Suiri (2012) as Yukari Fujita

Films
Chicken Is Barefoot (2004) as Naoko Sakurai
Cherry Pie (2006) as Chiharu Kinoshita
Bokura no Hōteishiki (2008)
Happy Flight (2008) as Shiori Nakajima
Rogue Ninja (2009) as Ukagami
Ninja (2009) as Namiko Takeda
Time Traveller: The Girl Who Leapt Through Time (2010) as Nurse
Garo: Red Requiem (2010) as Karma (voice only)
Alien vs Ninja (2010) as Rin
Cheerfu11y (2011) as Rin Ishikawa
Ninja: Shadow of a Tear (2013) as Namiko Takeda

V-Cinema
Kiba Gaiden (2011) as Kaoru Mitsuki/Messiah

References

External links
Official profile at Stardust Promotion 
Official blog at Ameba 
 

1982 births
Living people
Actors from Fukuoka Prefecture
Japanese idols
21st-century Japanese actresses
Stardust Promotion artists
Models from Fukuoka Prefecture